Overton-on-Dee railway station was a station to the southeast of Overton-on-Dee, Wrexham, Wales at Lightwood Green. The station was opened on 2 November 1895 and closed on 10 September 1962.

The station had a goods yard and adjacent livestock market. On the west side a creamery was built around 1919 operated by the Co-Operative Wholesale Society (CWS), and in 1928 with the adoption of milk tank wagons in place of milk churns a siding was extended to the creamery. The creamery closed just before WW2. Also adjacent to the station goods yard was the Overton Brick and Tile Works which closed around WW2 or shortly afterwards.

References

Further reading

Disused railway stations in Wrexham County Borough
Railway stations in Great Britain opened in 1895
Railway stations in Great Britain closed in 1940
Railway stations in Great Britain opened in 1946
Railway stations in Great Britain closed in 1962
Former Cambrian Railway stations